Umberto Fabris was a Yugoslav politician and Mayor of Split during World War II.

Yugoslav politicians